Gysmanshoek Pass, is situated in the Western Cape, province of South Africa between Heidelberg Wc and Warmwaterberg.
 Road skill level: Intermediate
 Road condition: Gravel surface

Mountain passes of the Western Cape